Mohammad Salman may also refer to:

 Mohammad bin Salman, Crown Prince of Saudi Arabia
 Mohammad Salman (cricketer), former Pakistani Test cricketer
 Mohammad Salman Hamdani, American-Pakistani biochemist
 Mohammad Salman Khan Baloch, Pakistani politician
 Mohamed Salman Al-Khuwalidi, Saudi Arabian long jumper